Dominique Senequier (born 1953) is a French businesswoman.  She is president of Ardian (formerly Axa Private Equity), a private equity firm she founded in 1996.

Early life and education

Dominique Senequier attended high school at Lycée Thiers in Marseille. She holds a postgraduate degree in Banking and Monetary Economics from the University of Sorbonne.

She was one of the first seven women admitted to the École Polytechnique in 1972, the year of its first female intake.

Career

Dominique Senequier began her career as insurance commissioner for the French Ministry of Finance, where she worked from 1975 until 1980.

She worked in reinsurance, international development, and private equity at GAN, a subsidiary of Groupama from 1980 to 1996. She also created and developed the subsidiary GAN Participations.

In 1996, she joined the Axa Group and founded Axa Private Equity, which became the largest private equity company in Europe with $50 billion of assets under management in 2014. In 2013, she announced that the firm was separating from Axa Group; it became Ardian.

Senequier has more than 410 employees running more than 50 active funds in 12 offices around the world.

She is a former director of Hewlett-Packard, having resigned in March 2012, and a former non-executive member of the board of directors of the Italian group Compagnie Industriali Riunite.

She is vice-president of the Supervisory Board of Hermès.

Influence
Senequier was ranked number 50 on Forbes list of The World's 100 Most Powerful Women in 2009. In 2011, she was number 98. She ranked 16th in 2013, and 12th in 2014.

In 2012 she was made a chevalier (knight) of the Legion of Honour.

She is a member of the International Actuarial Association.

In October 2013, she was named in the Bloomberg Top 50 Most Influential People in the world in Money Managers category.

Personal life

She is a concert-standard pianist who enjoys opera, sometimes travelling to Venice and Salzburg to hear it.

References

External links 
 ARDIAN
 CNN Money Most Powerful Women: The International Power 50
 The Wall Street Journal Dominique Senequier
 Financial Times 20 questions: Dominique Senequier

Living people
French businesspeople
Axa people
Chevaliers of the Légion d'honneur
1953 births
École Polytechnique alumni